George Haffner is a former American football player and coach.

Born in Chicago, Haffner prepped at football powerhouse Mount Carmel High School. While at the University of Notre Dame in 1960, Haffner was awarded the starting quarterback job by head coach Joe Kuharich. His first game was an impressive 21–17 victory over California.  However, the team finished the season with 2–8 record, and after losing the starting job to Daryle Lamonica, Haffner transferred to McNeese State University.

Following his graduation, Haffner was selected by the Baltimore Colts with the final pick in the 1965 NFL Draft. His professional career ended with the Norfolk Neptunes of the Continental Football League, after which he returned to the college ranks as a coach.

Haffner spent 31 years on various coaching staffs at NCAA Division I schools including 22 years as an offensive coordinator under such renowned head coaches as Bobby Bowden, Johnny Majors and Vince Dooley. While at the University of Georgia, he won a national championship and three conference championships and coached Heisman Trophy winner Herschel Walker. During his career, he coached at Iowa State University, the University of Pittsburgh, Florida State University, Texas A&M University, Georgia, Louisiana State University (LSU), the University of Nevada, Las Vegas (UNLV), and the University of Mary Hardin–Baylor.  He retired as the offensive coordinator  Mary Hardin–Baylor on February 1, 2006.

References

Year of birth missing (living people)
Living people
American football quarterbacks
Continental Football League players
Florida State Seminoles football coaches
Georgia Bulldogs football coaches
Iowa State Cyclones football coaches
Louisiana–Monroe Warhawks football coaches
LSU Tigers football coaches
Mary Hardin–Baylor Crusaders football coaches
McNeese Cowboys football players
Notre Dame Fighting Irish football players
Pittsburgh Panthers football coaches
Texas A&M Aggies football coaches
UNLV Rebels football coaches
Sportspeople from Chicago
Coaches of American football from Illinois
Players of American football from Chicago